La Chapelle-sous-Orbais (literally The Chapel under Orbais) is a commune in the Marne department in north-eastern France.

See also
Communes of the Marne department

References

Chapellesousorbais